Fluid Records was a jazz record label which released only 4 albums, although each featured legendary figures of the genre:

 Paragon – Dave Holland, Barry Altschul
 A Touch of the Blues – Clifford Jarvis, Cameron Brown
 Confirmation Cecil Bridgewater, Billy Harper, Calvin Hill
 Maple Leaf Rag – Herman Wright, Clifford Jarvis

Discography

Jazz record labels